not to be confused with the Dodge Correctional Institution near Waupun, Wisconsin

Dodge State Prison is a Georgia Department of Corrections state medium-security prison for men located in Chester, Dodge County, Georgia.  Current capacity of the facility is 1236 inmates.  

Dodge was one of nine Georgia state prisons implicated in an FBI sting operation announced in February 2016.  The agency indicted 47 correction officers who'd agreed to deliver illegal drugs while in uniform.  These charges were "part of a larger public corruption investigation into Georgia Correctional Facilities".

References

Prisons in Georgia (U.S. state)
Buildings and structures in Dodge County, Georgia
1983 establishments in Georgia (U.S. state)